Linosta centralis is a moth in the family Crambidae. It was described by Eugene G. Munroe in 1959. It is found in Central America.

References

Moths described in 1959
Crambidae